Israel Elejalde (born 1973) is a Spanish actor as well as a theatre director. Primarily a stage actor with television and film incursions, he had a breakthrough film performance with his role in the 2014 film Magical Girl, which earned him a nomination to the Goya Award for Best New Actor.

Biography 
Born in 1973 in Villaverde, Madrid, Elejalde's stage debut took place at the Juan de Villanueva High School in Orcasitas. He earned a licentiate degree in Political Science while training as an actor at William Layton's lab. He further trained at the  under José Luis Gómez and studied stage direction at the RESAD.

Some of his most important stage credits include those in Veraneantes, La función por hacer, and Misántropo. Primarily an actor, he also writes and directs. He was in a relationship with actress Bárbara Lennie, along with whom he performed in Magical Girl and different stage plays.

Filmography 

Film

Television

Awards and nominations

References 

1973 births
21st-century Spanish male actors
Spanish male television actors
Spanish male film actors
Spanish male stage actors
Living people